are traditional wooden townhouses found throughout Japan and typified in the historical capital of Kyoto.

The word  is written using two kanji:  meaning "town", and  meaning "house" or "shop" depending on the kanji used to express it.

in Kyoto, sometimes called , formed the defining characteristic of downtown Kyoto architecture for centuries, representing the standard defining form of the  throughout the country.

 homes traditionally also made use of different types of screens which would be changed with the seasons; woven bamboo screens used in summer allowed air to flow through, but helped to block the sun. The open air garden courtyards likewise aided in air circulation and brought light into the house.

Design elements

Silk or thread shops, rice sellers,  (geisha houses), and liquor stores, among others, each had their own distinctive style of latticework.

The main entrance into a  consists of two doors. The  (lit., "big door") was generally used only to transport goods, or large objects, into the building, while the smaller , or "side door", was for normal, everyday use, i.e. for people to enter and exit.

 often contain small courtyard gardens.

Community
 communities can be compared to the s of Beijing. Small neighborhoods made up of closely grouped homes organized on both sides of a narrow street, sometimes with small alleyways (roji []) in between the homes, help to create a strong sense of community. In addition, many areas were traditionally defined by a single craft or product. The  neighborhood, for example, is famous for its textiles; sharing a craft contributed greatly to a sense of community among fellow textile merchants in this area.

Destruction
, despite their status as part of Japan's cultural heritage, have undergone rapid decline in numbers in recent decades, with many being demolished in order to provide space for new buildings. Many reasons for this decline exist;  are considered to be difficult and expensive to maintain, are subject to greater risk of damage from fires or earthquakes than modern buildings, and are considered old-fashioned and outdated by some.

Roughly forty percent of those demolished were replaced with new modern houses, and another 40% were replaced with high-rise apartment buildings, parking lots, or modern-style commercial shops Of those  remaining, over 80% have suffered significant losses to the traditional appearance of their facades. Many of these  have also lost their tile roofs, becoming more boxed-out in shape; many have also had aluminum or steel shutters installed, as are commonly seen in small urban shops around the world.

In response to the decline in  numbers, however, some groups have formed with the express aim of restoring and protecting the  found in Kyoto. One such institution, the  Fund", was established in 2005 with the backing of a Tokyo-based benefactor. Many of these restored buildings serve, at least in part, as community centers.

Examples
There are many  remaining in Kyoto. Many are private residences, while others operating as businesses, notably cafes, and a few are museums.

See also
 Minka
 Kura (storehouse)
 Terraced houses

References

External links
 Virtual Tour of a Kyoto Machiya at the Boston Children's Museum (which shipped it from Japan).
 Kyoto Machiya Resource
 Living in Machiya
 Traditional Kyoto architecture
 Sugimoto Residence -- A Kyoto Machiya
 Japanese Architecture and Art Net Users System: Machiya
 JNTO site -- Kyoto Machiya
 Japan Visitor -- Kyoto Townhouses
The Herbert Offen Research Collection of the Phillips Library at the Peabody Essex Museum, and important research collection in regards to Machiya

Architecture in Japan
House types
Vernacular architecture
Housing in Japan